Flying, sometimes styled FLYING, is an aviation magazine published since 1927 and called Popular Aviation prior to 1942, as well as Aeronautics for a brief period. It is read by pilots, aircraft owners, aviation enthusiasts and aviation-oriented executives in business, commercial and general aviation markets worldwide.

It has the largest paid subscription, newsstand, and international circulation of any U.S.-based aviation magazine, according to its former publisher the Bonnier Corporation, and is promoted as "the world's most widely read aviation magazine". It is owned by digital media entrepreneur Craig Fuller.

History

The magazine first began publishing in 1927 as Popular Aviation soon after Charles Lindbergh's historic transatlantic flight. It was given the name Aeronautics briefly from 1929–1930 and was changed back to Popular Aviation until 1942, when it became Flying. 

In June 2009, Flying owner, Hachette Filipacchi Media U.S., sold the publication to the Bonnier Corporation, the U.S. division of the Sweden-based Bonnier Group, along with four other magazines: Popular Photography, Boating, Sound and Vision, and American Photo.

In July 2021, digital media entrepreneur and pilot Craig Fuller acquired Flying from the Bonnier Corporation and named the new parent company "Flying Media Group", with plans to expand its digital media platform, including online and mobile applications with a bigger focus on aviation photography, podcasts and streaming media. The print magazine went quarterly at the start of 2022, starting with Volume 149, issue 1, styled as "Q1 2022".

Demographics
In January 2010, the publication's demographics were:

 Male/female: 94%/6%
 Average age: 49.5
 Average HHI: $185,900
 Average net worth: $2,251,000

Contributors
 Richard Bach
 Gordon Baxter
 Richard L. Collins
 Peter Garrison
 Len Morgan
 Ernest K. Gann
 William Langewiesche
 Gill Robb Wilson
 Paul Bowen

References

External links
 Official site
 Flying magazine on Google Books – back issues from 1927 to 2008

1927 establishments in Florida
Monthly magazines published in the United States
Aviation magazines
Bonnier Group
Magazines established in 1927
Magazines published in Florida